The Georgia Writers Hall of Fame honors writers who have made significant contributions to the literary legacy of the state of Georgia. Established in 2000 by the University of Georgia Libraries’ Hargrett Rare Book and Manuscript Library, the Hall of Fame existed as a virtual presence until 2012, when it was given a physical space within the university's Richard B. Russell Building.   

The Georgia Writers Hall of Fame accepts public nominations. New inductees are elected by a board of judges convened by the University of Georgia librarian. Writers are eligible for nomination if they were born in Georgia or if they produced an important work while living in the state. 

It was hoped by the University of Georgia Libraries that the program "would attract donors by bringing living authors to campus and celebrating those of the past; also the ceremony and exhibits, ideally growing each year, could draw in funds for the Libraries' much-needed new buildings and its endowments, along with opening up possibilities for cultural programs and attracting additional writers (or their estates) who might choose to house their archives."

Inductees
2000
 Erskine Caldwell
 James Dickey
 W.E.B. Du Bois
 Joel Chandler Harris
 John Oliver Killens
 Martin Luther King, Jr.
 Sidney Lanier
 Augustus Baldwin Longstreet
 Carson McCullers
 Margaret Mitchell
 Flannery O'Connor
 Lillian Smith
 
2001
 Byron Herbert Reece
 
2002
 Harry Crews
 Jean Toomer
 Alice Walker
 
2003
 Conrad Aiken
 Elias Boudinot
 
2004
 Pat Conroy
 Henry W. Grady
 Ralph Emerson McGill
 
2006
 Jimmy Carter
 Terry Kay
 Frank Yerby
 
2007
 Caroline Miller
 Ferrol Sams
 Celestine Sibley
 Anne Rivers Siddons
 John Stone
 
2008
 Bailey White
 Calder Baynard Willingham, Jr.
 
2009
 Raymond Andrews
 Coleman Barks
 David Bottoms
 Robert Burch
 
2010
Judith Ortiz Cofer
Georgia Douglas Johnson
Walter Francis White
Philip Lee Williams
 
2011
Melissa Fay Greene
James Patrick Kilgo
Johnny Mercer
Natasha Trethewey
 
2013
Toni Cade Bambara
Judson Mitcham
 
2014
Olive Ann Burns
Mary Hood
Alfred Uhry
 
2015
Vereen Bell
Taylor Branch
Paul Hemphill
Janisse Ray
 
2016
Roy Blount Jr.
Brainard Cheney
Katharine DuPre Lumpkin
James Alan McPherson
Bill Shipp
 
2017
James Cobb
Alfred Corn
Eugenia Price
Kevin Young
 
2018
Furman Bisher
Michael Bishop
Tayari Jones
Frances Newman
Cynthia Shearer
 
2019
John T. Edge
Julia Collier Harris
A. E. Stallings

2020
N/A

2021
Valerie Boyd
Jericho Brown
Pearl Cleage
John Lewis
Clarence Major

References 

Writers halls of fame
American literary awards
University of Georgia people